Minuscule 785 (in the Gregory-Aland numbering), ε197 (von Soden), is a Greek minuscule manuscript of the New Testament written on parchment. Palaeographically it has been assigned to the 11th century. The manuscript has complex contents.

Description 
The codex contains the text of the four Gospels, on 230 parchment leaves (size ). The texts of Luke 22:29-23:17; 23:56-24:53; John 7:12-8:2; 9:19-21:25 were supplied by a later hand.

The text is written in one column per page, 21 lines per page.

There is also another division according to the smaller Ammonian Sections (in Mark 241 sections – the last in 16:20), but without a references to the Eusebian Canons.

The pictures have Latin subscriptions.

Text 
The Greek text of the codex is a representative of the Byzantine text-type. Hermann von Soden classified it to the textual family Kx. Aland placed it in Category V.

According to the Claremont Profile Method it represent the textual family Kx in Luke 1, Luke 10, and Luke 20.

History 
According to C. R. Gregory the manuscript was written in Calabria in the 11th century. The manuscript is currently dated by the INTF to the 11th century. The name of scribe was Sergius, a monk.

The manuscript was noticed in catalogue from 1876.

It was added to the list of New Testament manuscripts by Gregory (785). Gregory saw the manuscript in 1886.

The manuscript is now housed at the National Library of Greece (118) in Athens.

See also 

 List of New Testament minuscules
 Biblical manuscript
 Textual criticism
 Minuscule 784

References

Further reading 

 

Greek New Testament minuscules
11th-century biblical manuscripts
Manuscripts of the National Library of Greece